Aspergillus thesauricus is a species of fungus in the genus Aspergillus. It is from the Usti section. The species was first described in 2012.

Growth and morphology

A. thesauricus has been cultivated on both Czapek yeast extract agar (CYA) plates and Malt Extract Agar Oxoid® (MEAOX) plates. The growth morphology of the colonies can be seen in the pictures below.

References 

thesauricus
Fungi described in 2012